Bruno Gonçalves de Jesus (born 14 March 2003), known as Bruno Gonçalves or Bruninho, is a Brazilian footballer who currently plays as a forward for Red Bull Bragantino. He was included in The Guardian's "Next Generation 2020".

Career statistics

Notes

References

2003 births
Living people
Footballers from São Paulo
Brazilian footballers
Brazil youth international footballers
Association football forwards
Campeonato Brasileiro Série A players
Red Bull Brasil players
Red Bull Bragantino players